Mauerkirchen is a municipality in the district of Braunau am Inn in the Austrian state of Upper Austria.

References

Cities and towns in Braunau am Inn District